35S or 35-S may refer to:

 Wasco State Airport (FAA identifier: 35S), an airport in Sherman County, Oregon, U.S.
 35th parallel south, a geographical latitude
 Rollei 35 S, a 35 mm camera
 Sulfur-35 (35S), the most stable radioactive isotope of sulfur, used in biochemical research to radioactively label proteins
 HP 35s, a scientific calculator
 the 35S promoter from the cauliflower mosaic virus, used for constitutive expression in plants

See also
 S35 (disambiguation)